The 2005 Elite League speedway season was the 71st season of the top division of speedway in the United Kingdom and governed by the Speedway Control Bureau (SCB), in conjunction with the British Speedway Promoters' Association (BSPA).

Season summary
In 2005, the league consisted of ten teams, with the title being decided by a play-off between the top four.

Belle Vue Aces topped the regular season table and won the Knockout Cup. Their world champion rider Jason Crump was in superb form throughout the season. Fellow Australian Leigh Adams topped the league averages for Swindon for arguably the second consecutive season but it was Coventry Bees that experienced their first title success since the glory days of the late 1980s. Coventry had finished bottom of the table during the previous season and with the exception of finishing runner-up in 2003 had been starved of success. The club made a change that proved instrumental, they brought in Scott Nicholls from Ipswich and supported by Andreas Jonsson and Chris Harris the team defeated Belle Vue in the Elite League Play off final.

Final table

Play-offs
Semi-final decided over one leg. Grand Final decided by aggregate scores over two legs.

Semi-finals
Belle Vue Aces 53-40 Eastbourne Eagles
Coventry Bees 55-41 Peterborough Panthers

Final

First leg

Second leg

The Coventry Bees were declared League Champions, winning on aggregate 101-83.

Elite League Knockout Cup
The 2005 Elite League Knockout Cup was the 67th edition of the Knockout Cup for tier one teams. Belle Vue Aces were the winners of the competition.

First round

Quarter-finals

Semi-finals

Final

First leg

Second leg

The Belle Vue Aces were declared Knockout Cup Champions, winning on aggregate 97-83.

Leading final averages

Riders & final  averages
Arena Essex

 10.06
 8.14
 6.43
 6.21
 6.05
 5.94
 5.66
 5.09
 4.96
 4.48
 4.20

Belle Vue

 10.35
 7.87
 7.69
 7.35
 6.95
 6.36
	5.09
 4.43
 1.50
 1.43

Coventry

 9.45
 8.76
 7.20
 7.20
 6.79
 6.43
 6.22
 6.00
 4.20

Eastbourne

 10.30
 7.75 
 7.22
 7.11
 6.45
 4.76
 4.65
 2.56

Ipswich

 9.44
 8.43
 7.91 
 6.99
 5.91
 5.27
 3.82
 3.28
 3.16

Oxford

 9.32
 7.95
 7.45 
 6.36
 6.24
 6.22
 5.09
 4.15
 4.00
 3.06
 2.67
 1.28

Peterborough

 9.48 
 8.19
 7.38
 7.21
 7.10
 6.62
 6.05
 2.95
 2.05

Poole

 9.27 
 8.13
 7.78
 7.38
 6.26
 5.28
 4.35
 3.69
 2.13

Swindon

 10.42
 8.85
 8.48
 4.59
 4.38
 4.10
 3.93
 3.89
 3.76
 1.67

Wolverhampton

 8.82
 7.44 
 6.98
 6.65
 6.36
 5.61
 5.23

See also
 Speedway in the United Kingdom
 List of United Kingdom Speedway League Champions
 Knockout Cup (speedway)

References

SGB Premiership
2005 in British motorsport